"Steam" is a song by English pop boy band East 17, released on 19 September 1994 as the second single from their second album by the same name (1994). It was a major hit in Europe, peaking at number six in Portugal, number seven in the UK and number eight in Scotland, while reaching the top 20 in Australia, Denmark, Finland, Italy, the Netherlands and Switzerland.

Critical reception
In his weekly UK chart commentary, James Masterton said, "Whilst the last single was in truth a little wimpy "Steam" cranks up the pace and marks a return to the white-boy pop/rap the band have carved a niche for themselves with." Pan-European magazine Music & Media wrote, "Street cred they've always had, more than all their competitors combined, but even with a Carter USM remix to their account, it's a proven fact that these lads have grown up." Alan Jones from Music Week gave "Steam" four out of five and named it Single of the Week, adding, "Rock guitars and whistling are just two elements of this introductory jackswing-style single from the forthcoming East 17 album. Far from their best, but they have enough impetus to score Top 10 hits at will."

Music video
A music video was produced to promote the single. It features the band performing at a concert, and was directed by English singer, songwriter, musician and music video director Kevin Godley. "Steam" was later published on YouTube in September 2017. It had generated over a half million views as of September 2021.

Track listings

 12", UK (1994)
"Steam" (Overworld Haze Mix)
"Steam" (Man City Mix)
"Steam" (P. & C Mix)

 CD single, Europe (1994)
"Steam" (Vapoureyes Mix) — 3:25
"Steam" (Carter USM SW2 Mix) — 3:58

 CD single, UK & Europe (1994)
"Steam" (Vapoureyes Mix) — 3:24
"Steam" (Carter USM SW2 Mix) — 4:00
"Deep" (Delta Steam House Of Funk Mix) — 4:24
"Steam" (Overworld Haze Dub) — 6:50

 CD single, France (1994)
"Steam" (Vapoureyes Mix) — 3:25
"Steam" (Carter USM SW2 Mix) — 3:58

 CD maxi, Australia (1995)
"Steam" (Vapoureyes Mix) — 3:24
"Steam" (Carter USM SW2 Mix) — 4:00
"Steam" (Overworld Heat Mix) — 5:59
"Steam" (P + C No. 2 Mix) — 7:34

 Cassette single, UK & Europe (1994)
"Steam" (Vapoureyes Mix) — 3:24
"Steam" (Carter USM SW2 Mix) — 4:00

Charts

References

1994 singles
1994 songs
East 17 songs
London Records singles
Music videos directed by Kevin Godley
Songs written by Tony Mortimer